Thomas Alvin Farr (born October 24, 1954) is an American attorney. Farr was nominated by President Donald Trump for a judgeship on the United States District Court for the Eastern District of North Carolina in 2017, and again in 2018. Farr was considered a controversial nominee due to his alleged involvement in suppression of African-American voters. On November 29, 2018, Republican U.S. Senators Jeff Flake and Tim Scott announced their opposition to Farr's nomination, together with unanimous opposition of Senate Democrats, made it impossible for Farr's nomination to be confirmed.

Early life and education 
Farr was born in Cincinnati, Ohio. He earned his Bachelor of Liberal Studies, summa cum laude, from Hillsdale College, where he was co-salutatorian. He received his Juris Doctor from the Emory University School of Law and a Master of Laws in labor law from the Georgetown Law.

Career 
After graduating from law school, Farr served as a law clerk to Judge Frank William Bullock Jr. of the United States District Court for the Middle District of North Carolina. Prior to entering private practice, he was an attorney with the National Right to Work Legal Defense Foundation and counsel to the United States Senate Committee on Labor and Human Resources. He is currently a shareholder in the Raleigh office of Ogletree, Deakins, Nash, Smoak & Stewart, P.C. where his practice focuses on employment matters and constitutional law.

Farr is considered an expert in the field of gerrymandering and has spoken at ALEC on the subject. Farr has been a member of the Federalist Society since 1985.

North Carolina racial voter suppression

Farr has been accused of voter suppression towards African-American voters. In November 2018, Republican Senator Tim Scott opposed Farr's nomination for a federal judgeship, citing a 1991 DOJ memo on Farr's involvement in the 1984 Jesse Helms campaign's alleged voter suppression against African-Americans.

North Carolina voter ID law 
In 2010, Farr advised the North Carolina General Assembly in what federal courts termed a "racial gerrymander" of the state's voting districts. Farr was involved with drafting the 2013 North Carolina voter I.D. law and helped legislators evaluate racial data requested from the North Carolina DMV, which showed that black voters disproportionately lacked driver's licenses. The DMV data also "revealed that African Americans disproportionately used early voting, same-day registration, and out-of-precinct voting", all of which were curtailed by the law, while absentee voting, disproportionately used by white voters, was exempted from the voter ID requirements. Farr defended the voting restrictions in court before the United States Court of Appeals for the Fourth Circuit. The appeals court struck down the law, writing that the law targeted African Americans "with almost surgical precision."

Farr represented Republican state legislators in lawsuits related to redistricting and voter identification changes which were struck down by a court as racially biased. Newsweek described Farr as having a "history of working on voter suppression...part of a wider Republican effort that critics say disenfranchises African-Americans and the poor."

Jesse Helms campaigns 
In 1984, Farr was involved in the Jesse Helms Senate campaign. A 1991 memo from the Department of Justice under the George H.W. Bush administration stated that "Farr was the primary coordinator of the 1984 'ballot security' program conducted by the NCGOP and 1984 Helms for Senate Committee. He coordinated several 'ballot security' activities in 1984, including a postcard mailing to voters in predominantly black precincts which was designed to serve as a basis to challenge voters on election day."

In 1990, Farr served as the lead legal counsel on Jesse Helms' campaign. The campaign mailed two batches of postcards, totaling about 124,000, "virtually exclusively to black voters" warning "that residency requirements were strict and vote fraud was punishable by imprisonment." The first batch was sent "exclusively to the black voters who had a change of address associated with their name", while the recipients of the second batch were 93.1% African-American. 

The DOJ sued Helms, saying that the mailers were intended to intimidate African-Americans from voting. As the campaign's legal counsel, Farr defended Helms in the DOJ lawsuit. Farr himself "denied any role in drafting the postcards and said he did not know about them until after the mailers were sent" and was "'appalled' when he found out about them." Gerald Hebert, a former Department of Justice investigator, contradicted Farr's denial, stating that according to "contemporaneous handwritten notes", Farr partook in a meeting planning the postcards. The Leadership Conference on Civil and Human Rights and the NAACP Legal Defense and Educational Fund called upon the Senate to further question Farr about his apparent lack of candor. Senator Orrin G. Hatch, Republican of Utah and a member of the Senate Judiciary Committee, called the criticisms of Farr “utterly false character assassination nonsense.”

Federal judicial nominations
Farr was nominated to a federal judgeship in both 2006 and 2007 by George W. Bush, but he never received a vote in the Senate Judiciary Committee.

On July 13, 2017, President Trump nominated Farr to serve as a United States District Judge of the United States District Court for the Eastern District of North Carolina. Farr was nominated to fill the seat vacated by Judge Malcolm Jones Howard, who took senior status on December 31, 2005. On September 20, 2017, a hearing on his nomination was held before the Senate Judiciary Committee. On October 19, 2017, his nomination was reported out of committee by a party-line vote of 11–9. On January 3, 2018, Farr's nomination was returned to the President under Rule XXXI, Paragraph 6 of the United States Senate.

On January 5, 2018, President Trump announced his intent to renominate Farr to the U.S. District Court for the Eastern District of North Carolina. On January 8, 2018, his renomination was sent to the Senate. Farr was unanimously rated as "well qualified" by the American Bar Association. On January 18, 2018, his nomination was reported out of committee by an 11–10 vote.

Farr's nomination was opposed by the Congressional Black Caucus due to Farr's role as a lawyer defending North Carolina voting restrictions which were struck down by a court as racially biased. During his Senate confirmation hearing, Farr said that he disagreed with the Fourth Circuit panel's ruling and that "at the time our clients enacted those laws, I do not believe that they thought that were purposefully discriminating against African Americans." He added that if he were confirmed to the federal judiciary, he would follow the Fourth Circuit's ruling.

On November 28, 2018, the United States Senate voted 51–50 in favor of cloture on Farr's nomination, with Vice President Mike Pence casting the tie-breaking vote. The following day, Republican Senators Jeff Flake of Arizona and Tim Scott of South Carolina affirmed their opposition to Farr's nomination; with all 49 Democratic Senators opposed as well, the opposition from Flake and Scott all but assured that his nomination would be rejected.

On January 3, 2019, his nomination was returned to the President under Rule XXXI, Paragraph 6 of the United States Senate.

See also 
 Donald Trump judicial appointment controversies

References

External links 

 Appearances at the U.S. Supreme Court from the Oyez Project
 

1954 births
Living people
20th-century American lawyers
21st-century American lawyers
Emory University School of Law alumni
Federalist Society members
Georgetown University Law Center alumni
Hillsdale College alumni
Lawyers from Cincinnati
North Carolina lawyers
United States Senate lawyers